Mariko Miyagi (宮城 まり子) (March 21, 1927 – March 21, 2020) was a Japanese actress, singer, and advocate for children with disabilities. She founded the Kusunoki Gakuen, a school for disabled children.

Early life 
Miyagi was born Mariko Honme in Tokyo, Japan. She was the older of two siblings. Her family moved to Osaka when she was in the third grade because of her father's work. When she graduated from elementary school the family underwent a series of misfortunes, including her mother's death. Miyagi and her brother entered the Yoshimoto Kogyo production company and became singers.

Career 
Miyagi's first stage appearance was in October 1944. After the war, she continued performing at several theaters before releasing her first record in 1950 with Teichiku Records. Her first hit was "Anta Honto ni Sugoi wa ne", which was released by Victor Records. She continued releasing hits like "Gado-shita no Kutsumigaki" throughout the fifties, and appeared on the Kohaku Uta Gassen several times.

While preparing for a role in which she would play a child with cerebral palsy, Miyagi visited a facility for disabled children. Inspired by this, Miyagi started the Nemunoki Gakuen, a school for children with disabilities, in Omaezaki, Shizuoka in 1968. It was the first school of its kind, built when education for disabled children wasn't yet mandatory. The school's curriculum especially focused on music and the arts. It later moved to Kakegawa, Shizuoka. Miyagi directed and produced a documentary about the school called "Nemunoki no Uta".

In 2012 Miyagi was awarded the Order of the Sacred Treasure.

Miyagi died on March 21, 2020 of lymphoma.

Films

References 

2020 deaths
1927 births
Singers from Tokyo
Japanese film directors
Japanese film actresses
Japanese women singers
Recipients of the Order of the Sacred Treasure
Deaths from cancer in Japan
Deaths from lymphoma